Biscotasing station is a Via Rail sign post request stop station located in the community of Biscotasing, Ontario, Canada on the Sudbury – White River train.

External links
Via Rail page for Biscotasing train station

Via Rail stations in Ontario
Railway stations in Sudbury District
Canadian Pacific Railway stations in Ontario